Agladrillia pudica is a species of sea snail, a marine gastropod mollusk in the family Drilliidae.

Description
The size of an adult shell varies between 13 mm and 20 mm.
The whorls are shortly and obliquely ribbed. The ribs are obsolete on the back of the last whorl, depressed below the sutures. The color of the shell is yellowish brown, with a deep reddish chestnut spot on the back of the body whorl. The siphonal canal is rather long compared to the other species in this genus.

Distribution
This species occurs in the Pacific Ocean off Central America and Ecuador.

References

External links

 
 Hinds R.B. (1844–1845) The Zoology of the Voyage of H. M. S. “Sulphur”, Under the command of Captain Sir Edward Belcher, R.N., C.B., F.R.G.S., etc., during the years 1836–42. Vol. II, Mollusca. Smith, Elder and Co., London, v + 72 pp., 21 pls

pudica
Gastropods described in 1843